William Samuel Powell, D.D. (b Colchester 4 July 1717 - d Colchester 19 January 1775) was an eighteenth century academic and priest, most notably Vice Chancellor of the University of Cambridge from 1765 until 1766; and Archdeacon of Colchester from 1766 until his death.

Powell was born in Colchester. He was educated at Colchester Royal Grammar School and St John's College, Cambridge:  he was successively Fellow, Tutor, Taxor and Master Powell was ordained in 1741; and held livings at Colkirk, Stibbard and Freshwater.

Notes

1717 births
1775 deaths
People from Colchester
People educated at Colchester Royal Grammar School
18th-century scholars
Vice-Chancellors of the University of Cambridge
Masters of St John's College, Cambridge
Fellows of St John's College, Cambridge
Alumni of St John's College, Cambridge
18th-century English clergy
Archdeacons of Colchester